Stonewall Jackson School, also known as West End School, is a historic school building located in Richmond, Virginia. It was built in 1886–1887, is a tall two-story, brick and granite school building in the Italianate style.  It features a bracketed cornice and
shallow, standing seam metal, hipped roof.  The building consists of identical wings facing west and south, and a connecting curved bay, which contains a double stair.  Each wing has a cast-iron, Corinthian order porch, flanked by three bay classrooms. The building has been converted to professional offices.

It was added to the National Register of Historic Places in 1984.

References

School buildings on the National Register of Historic Places in Virginia
Italianate architecture in Virginia
School buildings completed in 1887
Schools in Richmond, Virginia
National Register of Historic Places in Richmond, Virginia